Laura "Lauren" Lane (born February 2, 1959) is an American film, television, stage actress, and professor. She is best known for her role as C.C. Babcock on The Nanny.

Life and career
Lane was born in Oklahoma City, Oklahoma, and raised in Arlington, Texas. She attended Lamar High School and received a Bachelor of Fine Arts degree from the University of Texas at Arlington. Lane also earned a Master's degree in the advanced training program at the American Conservatory Theater in San Francisco. In 2013, she briefly taught at Carnegie Mellon University. Lane is on the faculty of the Department of Theatre and Dance at Texas State University in San Marcos.

Lane was married to businessman David Wilkins and together they have one daughter, Kate Wilkins.

Lane began her acting career in the 1984 film, Interface. She went on to appear in television and film productions such as Positive I.D., Nervous Ticks, Hunter, and L.A. Law, before being cast as C.C. Babcock in The Nanny in 1993. Lane starred in The Nanny until the show ended in 1999. While still performing on The Nanny, she appeared on The Daily Show in August 1997.

Lane voiced Ivana Baiul in the 2000 film Gen¹³. In December 2004, she joined the rest of the cast of The Nanny for the Lifetime one-hour special, The Nanny Reunion: A Nosh to Remember.	

Since 2000, Lane has performed in various productions at the Zachary Scott Theatre, in Austin, Texas. In 2010, she was a guest on The Fran Drescher Show. In 2015, she starred in a one-off performance  in A. R. Gurney's Love Letters (play) opposite her The Nanny co-star Daniel Davis with proceeds going to the Texas State BFA Acting Program.

Filmography

Theater

References

External links
 

20th-century American actresses
21st-century American actresses
Actresses from Oklahoma City
Actresses from Texas
American film actresses
American stage actresses
American television actresses
American voice actresses
Carnegie Mellon University faculty
Lamar High School (Arlington, Texas) alumni
Living people
Texas State University faculty
University of Texas at Arlington alumni
American Conservatory Theater alumni
1959 births